Banu Adi was a clan of the Quraysh tribe descended from Adi ibn Ka'b. The Banu Adi were with the Meccans as part of the escort that preceded the Battle of Badr; they did not join Quraysh further.

Notable members
Among the clan members can be found:

Umar ibn al-Khattab
Zayd ibn al-Khattab, (died 632) companion of Muḥammad and the brother of Caliph Umar.
Sa'id bin Zayd, (died 671) companion of Muḥammad.
Zayd ibn Amr: (died 605) was a monotheist who lived in Mecca before Islam and father of Sa'id bin Zayd.
Khattab ibn Nufayl: father of Caliph Umar
Fatimah bint al-Khattab
Zayd ibn Umar: son of Caliph Umar
Abdullah ibn Umar: son of Caliph Umar
Hafsa bint Umar: wife of Muhammad
 Al-Shifa' bint Abdullah: the only literate female sahaba
 Asim ibn Umar: son of Caliph Umar, one of the Tabi‘in.
 Salim ibn Abd-Allah (d. 728) was the famous Tabi‘un, scholar and hadith narrator. He was the grandson of caliph Umar.
Umar ibn Ibrahim ibn Waqid al-Umari, the Governor of Yemen for the Abbasid Caliphate from 813 to mid-814 CE.
Abu Turab al-Zahiri: born in India of Arab Indian descent

See also 
Family tree of Umar

References